Kindred is the third studio album by American electropop band Passion Pit. It was released on April 21, 2015, by Columbia Records.

Background
On June 24, 2014, lead singer Michael Angelakos announced through Twitter that Passion Pit are working on their as yet to be titled third studio album. Angelakos confirmed that the third album would in fact be released in 2015. In anticipation of the release, the band posted several coded images to various social networking platforms. Soon after the release of the Morse code image, the official Passion Pit website, which had been under construction since the end of the 2013 tour, came back up. It is now known as "KindredTheAlbum.com". The website includes a short 13 second clip titled "That flickering light's just a flame" and a picture of Angelakos jumping in the air.

On February 16, 2015, the band uploaded the lead single for the new album "Lifted Up (1985)" onto its YouTube channel.  The band then followed up by releasing the names of the rest of the tracks and by announcing the album would be available for pre-order the following day (Tuesday February 17, 2015). The third track, titled "Where the Sky Hangs" was also released on Passion Pit's Vevo page in the early hours of February 17, 2015.

On April 14, 2015, the album began streaming on iTunes Radio's First Play station as a preview for the album to be released.

Reception
Kindred has received generally positive reviews, obtaining a normalised score of 72 based on 22 reviews.

Track listing

Charts

References

2015 albums
Columbia Records albums
Passion Pit albums